During the 1966-1967 season Juventus competed in Serie A, Coppa Italia and Fairs Cup .

Summary 

The club face the ban over transfers of foreign players imposed by Italian Federation of Football to all teams in Serie A and it will not lift until 1980. After 6 years, Juventus clinched the national title again winning the race against La Grande Inter.

Squad

Competitions

Serie A

League table

Results by round

Matches

Coppa Italia

Second round

Eightfinals

Quarterfinals

Semifinals

Fairs Cup

First round

Round of 32

Eightfinals

Quarterfinals

Statistics

Goalscorers
 

16 goals
 Giampaolo Menichelli

13 goals
 Virginio De Paoli

12 goals
 Gianfranco Zigoni

5 goals
 Erminio Favalli

4 goals
 Giancarlo Bercellino
 Luis del Sol
 Gianfranco Leoncini
 Sandro Salvadore

3 goals
 Chinesinho

2 goals
 Adolfo Gori
 Gino Stacchini

1 goal
 Ernesto Càstano

References

 
 
 
 l'Unità, 1966 and 1967.
 La Stampa, 1966 and 1967.

External links 
 http://www.calcio.com/tutte_le_partite/ita-serie-a-1966-1967/

See also
Juventus F.C.

Juventus F.C. seasons
Italian football championship-winning seasons